Warburton is a village and civil parish within the Metropolitan Borough of Trafford in Greater Manchester, England. Historically in Cheshire, Warburton lies on the south bank of the River Mersey between the borough of Warrington and Greater Manchester. In the 21st century, the village remains predominantly rural. Altrincham is the nearest town. According to the 2001 census, the parish had a population of 286.

Warburton has a history of settlement stretching back to the 11th century, with the possibility of earlier habitation. There are 17 listed buildings in the village, including the timber framed Grade I Church of St Werburgh, which is at least 700 years old. Among the other listed buildings are examples of architect John Douglas' work, including the second Church of St Werburgh, built in 1883. In 2006, Time Team excavated in the lands of Moss Brow Farm in Warburton, looking for a Roman fortlet. However, no evidence of a fortlet was found and the previously identified 'punic' ditch turned out to be the remains of an 18th-century hedgerow.

History

Some limited evidence has been found of activity on the site of Warburton dating from the Bronze Age, through the Iron Age and Roman periods; these include a flint blade, six Mesolithic tools, pieces of quernstone, and a snake bracelet. Archaeological evidence indicates that the area around Warburton has been used agriculturally since at least the Roman times. In the Domesday Book, the name was Warburgtune which name has evolved to today's 'Warburton'. The suffix –ton means a settlement or farmstead in Old English, indicating that the settlement has pre-Conquest origins. It has been suggested that Warburton was the site of an Anglo-Saxon burgh or defended settlement, possibly either called "Toppingburgh" orWeard byrig, established by Aethelflaed, Queen of the Mercians, in 915 during the wars with the Vikings. However, it now seems likely that site lay on the Wales–Cheshire border.

The first documented reference to Warburton occurs in the Domesday Book, where the two manors of Warburton were recorded; the manors were united by the late 12th century. Before the Norman conquest, the area was controlled by the Anglo-Saxon thegn Aelfward. Although the Domesday Book records no church in Warburton, it is possible that the church dedicated to Saint Werburgh is pre-Conquest. The omission of the church may not be significant, as not all pre-Conquest churches or chapels were recorded in the Domesday survey. The first documented evidence of a church in Warburton was in a deed of 1187, when it was a chapel of ease for the parish of Lymm. Warburton became a separate parish in the 13th century. The church is surrounded by a ditch and bank, probably dating to at least the 14th century. Warburton is also the site of a medieval priory, near the Church of St Werburgh; although the priory was only formed in the 13th century, it was dissolved in 1270.

Warburton was predominantly a farming village during the medieval period. The north western corner of the township was used as a deer park. Warburton grew as an agricultural town during the medieval period, and it remained almost untouched by the Industrial Revolution; this is reflected in the population change between 1801 and 1901, dropping from 466 to 403, with little variation at a time when the rest of Trafford was expanding rapidly.

Administration
The civil parish of Warburton was created in 1894, under the Local Government Act 1894 and has its own parish council. Warburton became part of the Metropolitan Borough of Trafford in 1974 upon the borough's creation, but was previously in Bucklow Rural District. The village is part of the Bowdon electoral ward; as of the 2012 local elections the councillors for the Bowdon ward are all Conservative. Warburton lies in the Altrincham and Sale West constituency, which since its formation in 1997 has been represented in the House of Commons by the Conservative MP Sir Graham Brady.

Geography
The village of Lymm lies to the south west of Warburton in the borough of Warrington, with the River Bollin forming the border between the two villages. The Bollin joins the River Mersey in the village; however the Mersey in Warburton has dried up, as it was diverted into the Manchester Ship Canal further upstream. To the east lie Dunham Town, Dunham Massey, Bowdon and Altrincham, with Little Bollington to the south, and Partington and Urmston to the north. The local geology is lower keuper marl, with a ridge of sand and gravel running from Warburton to Dunham.

Transport
The main roads running through Warburton are the A6144 and B5159. A local bus service, 5 (operated by Warrington Borough Transport) links Warburton with Warrington and Altrincham. Formerly, the 38 (operated by Warrington Coachways) also used to serve the village.

Demography
At the 2001 UK census, Warburton had a total population of 286. For every 100 females, there were 121.7 males. The average household size was 2.44. Of those aged 16–74 in Warburton, 43.2% had no academic qualifications or one GCSE, similar to the figures for all of Trafford (40.8%) and in England (45.5%). According to the census, 1.40% were unemployed and 33.49% were economically inactive. 16.43% of the population were under the age of 16 and 6.64% were aged 75 and over; the mean age of the people of Warburton was 43.03. 69.34% of residents described their health as 'good'.

Population change

Landmarks

Churches

Warburton has two churches of note. St Werburgh's is a timber framed church and a Grade I Listed Building, one of six in Trafford. Of the 29 timber-framed churches that survive in England and Wales, St Werbugh's is one of the oldest. The church dates to at least the 14th century, and may be built on the site of an earlier Saxon chapel. It is rarely used for worship but is accessible to visitors. The church features an early-17th-century font, a Jacobean pulpit, and a 1645 altar. Nearby are the remains of the old village cross, complete with stocks whose wooden restraints are modern, though the supporting pillars are much older. The other church in Warburton, also dedicated to St Werburgh, was built in 1883 by John Douglas and is a Grade II Listed Building. The church is made of red sandstone with a clay tile roof.

Grade II listed buildings

As well as the two churches dedicated to Saint Werburgh, there are 15 other Grade II listed buildings. The parish rooms and caretaker's house were built in 1889, and designed by John Douglas. Also built in the village by Douglas was the post office in 1893, and Warburton School in 1871–72; this has been converted to a residence but still features crucks supporting the roof. Some farm buildings in Warburton are also listed, including the farmhouse on Moss Lane. The barn is 18th-century but features crucks which may be 17th-century or earlier. The timber framed farm building on Park Road is 17th-century in origin; the late-18th-century farmhouse on Warburton Lane was made with Flemish bond brick and has a slate roof. The barn on Paddock Lane dates from the 17th century. Also on Paddock Lane are two farmhouses: one was built in 1717 by Thomas Egerton and features an inglenook fireplace; the other is Wigsey Farmhouse which was originally built in the 17th century with later additions, including a 19th-century porch. The building on Warburton Lane near Villa Farmhouse was originally a timber-framed building from the 16th or early 17th century. The house features late-16th- or early-17th-century frescos of a woman, possibly St Werburgh, with two geese and a rose.

There is the base of a stone cross on Townfield Lane, and wooden stocks nearby, probably dating from the 17th century. One of the more unusual listed structures in Warburton is the 25 m stretch of wall constructed from flagstones, probably built in the 18th or 19th century. There are two listed structures in the grounds of the old Church of St Werburgh: a lychgate from the late 19th century, and a sundial from 1765.

Warburton Toll Bridge

Warburton Toll Bridge and Warburton Bridge Road form a privately-owned statutory tolled undertaking carrying a public highway upon which tolls are payable. The high-level cantilever bridge crosses the Manchester Ship Canal on the B5159 road, connecting the A57 with the A6144, and was commissioned under the Rixton and Warburton Bridge Act 1863. The original stone bridge spanned the River Mersey prior to its later diversion into the Manchester Ship Canal, over which a new bridge was built. Section 29 of the Rixton and Warburton Bridge Act established that if another company needed to erect a bridge, then that company and not the toll would be responsible for all costs, including its ongoing maintenance. This occurred when the Manchester Ship Canal company built a bridge, and this responsibility for the maintenance was then confirmed in the Manchester Ship Canal Act. The new bridge is not funded from the company's toll income.

Both bridges and the unadopted approach roads are privately maintained. It is one of the few remaining pre-motorway toll bridges in the United Kingdom, and the only one in Greater Manchester.

It is sometimes incorrectly claimed that the tolls are payable for crossing the now-defunct original River Mersey bridge, but section 48 of the Rixton and Warburton Bridge Act makes the toll payable for "passing over, along or upon the Bridge and Roads, or any of them, or any part thereof..." Section 9 of the Manchester Ship Canal (Various Powers) Act 1890 included the diversion of the original road and the new Ship Canal bridge within the scope of the toll charges.

The level of tolls was originally fixed, but can now be changed under the provisions of the Transport Charges &c. (Miscellaneous Provisions) Act 1954.

Time Team in Warburton
Since 1998, archaeological techniques such as field walking have led to the discovery of finds ranging in age from prehistoric flints and Bronze Age axe heads to Roman and late medieval finds. Featuring prominently amongst these finds were Roman artefacts including coins, brooches and a snake bracelet. At the invitation of local historian Jim Balme, Time Team excavated in Warburton in September 2006. They were searching for a Roman fortlet that previous archaeological digs by South Trafford Archaeological Group (STAG) indicated might be present. Though no evidence of a Roman fortlet was found, the discovery of strip lynchets indicates that there was a Romano-British farm in Warburton. The presence of Roman finds was explained as rubbish, mixed in with manure to be spread on the crops.

See also

Listed buildings in Warburton, Greater Manchester

References
Notes

Bibliography

External links

Rixton and Warburton Bridge Act 1863
Rixton and Warburton Bridge Amendment Act 1867
Warburton Toll Bridge Official Website
Warburton – Location map Bing Maps
No Stone Unturned, Warburton, Cheshire Time Team, Channel 4
Time Team in Warburton Channel 4
War Memorial, Warburton, Cheshire Carl's Cam

Villages in Greater Manchester
Civil parishes in Greater Manchester
Geography of Trafford